St. Michael parish is a Ruthenian Greek Catholic Church, which uses the Divine Liturgy of the Byzantine Rite. Accordingly, St. Michael is in full communion with the Bishop of Rome (more commonly referred to as the Pope of Rome) and is a parish within the Byzantine Catholic Eparchy of Parma.

External links
Byzantine Catholic Eparchy of Parma website

Byzantine Catholic Metropolia of Pittsburgh
Eastern Catholic churches in Ohio
Churches in Toledo, Ohio
Hungarian-American history
Hungarian-American culture in Ohio
Rusyn-American culture in Ohio
Rusyn-American history